Dalia Kaddari (born 23 March 2001) is an Italian athlete sprinter who specialises in the 200 metres. She won a gold medal at the 2021 European U23 Championships. Kaddari is also a two time Italian champion in the event.

At the age of 17, Kaddari was the 2018 Youth Olympic 200 m silver medallist. She competed at the 2020 Summer Olympics, in 200 m.

Biography
Kaddari was born on 23 March 2001 in Cagliari, Sardinia, to an Italian mother and Moroccan-born father.

Growing up, she set consecutive Italian records in her signature event of the 200 metres. Aged 17, she won a silver medal at the 2018 Youth Olympics in Buenos Aires with a national under-18 best time of 23.45 seconds.

In 2019-20, she set national indoor under-20 records, ultimately lowering it to 23.85 s. In August 2020, while still a junior, Kaddari took a gold medal in the outdoor event at the Italian Championships, with a personal best of 23.30 s. In September, she took 0.02 off the Italian under-20 record clocking 23.23 s in Bellinzona, Switzerland.

In May 2021, Kadari finished second at the European Team Championships, whose Super League events took place in Chorzów, Poland. She won her second Italian title in June, and the next month, she earned a gold medal at the European U23 Championships in Tallinn, Estonia.

Statistics

International competitions

National titles
 Italian Championships
 200 m (2): 2020 (senior title while under-20), 2021

See also
 Italian all-time lists - 200 metres

Notes

References

External links

 

2001 births
Italian female sprinters
Living people
Athletes (track and field) at the 2018 Summer Youth Olympics
Sportspeople from Cagliari
Italian people of Moroccan descent
Italian sportspeople of African descent
Athletics competitors of Fiamme Oro
Italian Athletics Championships winners
Athletes (track and field) at the 2020 Summer Olympics
Olympic athletes of Italy
Olympic female sprinters
Sardinian women
21st-century Italian women
European Athletics Championships medalists